Longsleddale is a civil parish in the South Lakeland District of Cumbria, England. It contains nine listed buildings that are recorded in the National Heritage List for England.  All the listed buildings are designated at Grade II, the lowest of the three grades, which is applied to "buildings of national importance and special interest".  The parish is in the Lake District National Park and consists of a long valley between hills, its only community being the hamlet of Sadgill.  The listed buildings consist of farmhouses, farm buildings and two bridges.


Buildings

References

Citations

Sources

Lists of listed buildings in Cumbria